Willie Alford Thornton (born December 7, 1983) is an American professional basketball player for Peñarol Mar del Plata of the Liga Nacional de Básquet (LNB). He had formerly played for the Los Angeles Clippers, Washington Wizards and the Golden State Warriors. Collegiately, he played for Florida State University.

College career
Thornton's outstanding four-year career at Florida State University was capped off by a stellar individual senior year that saw him make the AP All-American squad as a third team choice, a unanimous selection as first-team All-ACC, and was runner-up to Boston College's Jared Dudley for the ACC Player of the Year. He led the ACC in scoring and averaged over 7 rebounds per game as well. His season came to a disappointing end as the Seminoles did not qualify for the NCAA tournament for the ninth straight season and were forced to play in the NIT.

Professional career

Los Angeles Clippers
On June 28, 2007, Thornton was taken 14th overall in the 2007 NBA Draft by the Los Angeles Clippers. Thornton also has the same agent as Yao Ming.
On July 9, Thornton played his first summer league game for the Clippers, scoring 24 points and registering 8 rebounds, 1 assist, and 2 blocks in a 108–102 loss to the Denver Nuggets.

In just his third preseason game as a rookie, Thornton led the Clippers to a win over the Golden State Warriors with 24 points on 11–15 shooting, including a perfect 2–2 from behind the 3-point arc while also connecting on all 8 of his first attempts from the floor.

With Ruben Patterson in the starting lineup at the start of the season, Thornton would not get the playing time he had received during preseason. Patterson was waived on December 13, 2007 in order to give the rookie more playing time. With a slew of injuries to the Clippers' big men, including Paul Davis with a torn ACL, Tim Thomas with recurring back and ankle injuries, and Elton Brand sidelined with a ruptured achilles tendon, Thornton took advantage of his minutes playing power forward and small forward when teammate Corey Maggette was on the bench.

On January 30, 2008, Thornton scored a then season-high 33 points against the Atlanta Hawks, including a significant block in the final seconds in a 95–88 Clipper win. Thornton also recorded his first double-double on February 9, in a loss to the Philadelphia 76ers, in which he had 18 points and 10 rebounds.

On March 29, 2008, Thornton equaled a rookie franchise record (and Clippers season-high) 39 points on 13 of 23 field goal shooting, 3 of 6 from behind the arch, and 10 of 12 from the line in a 110–97 win over the Memphis Grizzlies. Thornton scored 20 of his 39 in the fourth quarter to seal the win and snap the Clippers' 10-game losing streak.

On May 13, 2008, Al Thornton was named to the 2008 NBA All-Rookie First Team.

On October 31, 2008, Thornton had a double-double with 30 points and 11 rebounds, a season high.

Washington Wizards
On February 17, 2010, Thornton was traded from the Los Angeles Clippers to the Washington Wizards as part of a three-team, six-player trade that sent Antawn Jamison from Washington to the Cleveland Cavaliers, Žydrūnas Ilgauskas, a 2010 first round pick and the rights to Emir Preldžič from Cleveland to Washington, Drew Gooden from Washington to Los Angeles, and Sebastian Telfair from Los Angeles to Cleveland.

Golden State Warriors
On March 1, 2011, he reached a buyout agreement with the Wizards and was waived. He signed a contract with the Golden State Warriors on March 3, 2011.

On March 14, 2011, Thornton scored 23 points against the Sacramento Kings, his most points as a member of the Warriors.

Puerto Rico
On February 19, 2012, he signed with the Guayama Wizards of the Puerto Rican basketball league Baloncesto Superior Nacional. There he averaged 18.7 points per game.

China
On September 29, 2012, Thornton signed with the Zhejiang Lions of the Chinese Basketball Association. Due to injury, he was replaced mid-season by Gary Forbes.

Return to Puerto Rico
In March 2014, he rejoined the Guayama Wizards of the Baloncesto Superior Nacional.

Philippines
On January 2, 2015, he signed with the NLEX Road Warriors.

In January 2016, Thornton returned to the Philippines to play again for the NLEX Road Warriors for the 2016 Commissioner's Cup.

Thornton was tapped to represent the Mighty Sports PH the representative club of the Philippines at the 2016 William Jones Cup.

Thornton led the Mighty Sports-Philippines past South Korea on its second day with 24 points in an 86-65 win. Thornton once again led the Mighty Sports by beating India  81-101 with 30 points and on the following day versus Iran 80-73 tallying 24 points and 10 rebounds.  Thornton carried the Mighty Sports to a 7-0 win–loss record in the tournament with a double-double 20 points and 15 rebounds by beating Egypt 61-80 and eventually winning the gold medal with an unblemish record of 8-0 by beating Chinese Taipei B 80-104 on the last day of the tournament.

Japan
On February 28, 2018, Thornton signed with the Shimane Susanoo Magic of the Japanese B.League.

The BIG 3
Thornton had initially gone undrafted in the inaugural BIG 3 draft. Al was later acquired by Allen Iverson's 3's Company" team. Al provided "3's Company" with scoring off the bench and went on to become the league's first "4th man of the year".

Uruguay
On August 7, 2020, Thornton signed with Club Atlético Aguada of the Liga Uruguaya de Basketball.

NBA career statistics

Regular season 

|-
| align="left" | 
| align="left" | L.A. Clippers
| 79 || 31 || 27.3 || .429 || .331 || .743 || 4.5 || 1.2 || .6 || .5 || 12.7
|-
| align="left" | 
| align="left" | L.A. Clippers
| 71 || 67 || 37.4 || .446 || .253 || .754 || 5.2 || 1.5 || .8 || .9 || 16.8
|-
| align="left" | 
| align="left" | L.A. Clippers
| 51 || 30 || 27.5 || .478 || .357 || .741 || 3.8 || 1.2 || .5 || .4 || 10.7
|-
| align="left" | 
| align="left" | Washington
| 24 || 16 || 28.1 || .463 || .353 || .694 || 4.3 || 1.2 || .8 || .5 || 10.7
|-
| align="left" | 
| align="left" | Washington
| 49 || 23 || 21.8 || .471 || .160 || .757 || 3.2 || 1.0 || .6 || .2 || 8.0
|-
| align="left" | 
| align="left" | Golden State
| 22 || 0 || 14.3 || .490 || .000 || .829 || 2.6 || .5 || .3 || .1 || 6.0
|- class=sortbottom
| align="center" colspan=2| Career
| 296 || 167 || 28.0 || .452 || .293 || .747 || 4.2 || 1.2 || .6 || .5 || 11.9

Personal
Thornton is a cousin of fellow NBA player Marcus Thornton. He is the son of Alford and Philomenia Thornton.

References

External links

Washington Wizards profile
DraftExpress.com profile
ESPN.com profile
NBADraft.net profile
Rotoworld.com profile

1983 births
Living people
African-American basketball players
All-American college men's basketball players
American expatriate basketball people in China
American expatriate basketball people in the Philippines
American expatriate basketball people in Venezuela
American men's basketball players
Baloncesto Superior Nacional players
Basketball players from Georgia (U.S. state)
Big3 players
Florida State Seminoles men's basketball players
Gaiteros del Zulia players
Golden State Warriors players
Los Angeles Clippers draft picks
Los Angeles Clippers players
NLEX Road Warriors players
People from Perry, Georgia
Philippine Basketball Association imports
Power forwards (basketball)
Shimane Susanoo Magic players
Small forwards
Washington Wizards players
Zhejiang Lions players
21st-century African-American sportspeople
20th-century African-American people
American men's 3x3 basketball players